Raymond Poulton (1916–1992) was a British film editor. During his career he worked on around forty productions, including two James Bond films Live and Let Die and The Man with the Golden Gun.

Selected filmography
 While I Live (1947)
 Maytime in Mayfair (1949)
 Edward, My Son (1949)
 My Daughter Joy (1950)
 The Hour of 13 (1952)
 Betrayed (1954)
 Flame and the Flesh (1954)
 That Lady (1955)
 Storm Over the Nile (1955)
 Port Afrique (1956)
 Invitation to the Dance (1956)
 Seven Waves Away (1957)
 The Long Haul (1957)
 The Two-Headed Spy (1958)
 Gideon's Day (1958)
 The Mouse That Roared (1959)
 The Three Worlds of Gulliver (1960)
 Barabbas (1961)
 The Secret Partner (1961)
 The Captive City (1962)
 Just for Fun (1963)
 Ballad in Blue (1964)
 Berserk! (1967)
 Fright (1971)
 Live and Let Die (1973)
 The Man with the Golden Gun (1974)
 The Spiral Staircase (1975)
 Force 10 from Navarone (1978)

References

Bibliography
 Blottner, Gene. Columbia Noir: A Complete Filmography, 1940-1962. McFarland, 2015.

External links

1916 births
1992 deaths
British film editors